A fractional-horsepower motor (FHP Motor) 

There is no defined minimum output, however, it is generally accepted that a motor with a frame size of less than 35mm square can be referred to as a 'micro-motor'.

Fractional-horsepower electric motors are exempt from the US Energy Policy Act of 2005 and the new EN 60034-30:2009 ruling of European directive 2005/32/EC concerning the efficiency classes of low-voltage three-phase asynchronous motors.

History
The earliest commercially successful electric motors date back to the latter part of the 19th century when Nikola Tesla patented his induction motor in 1888.

The development of fractional-horsepower motors, however, would not have taken place without the push toward urban, and later, rural electrification, using alternating current. Electrification began in cities around 1900, and Chester Beach, an employee of Hamilton-Beach company, invented a high-speed fractional motor in 1905, which the company used in its milkshake machine, the Cyclone Drink Mixer, introduced in 1910, and sold to urban drugstores for use in their soda fountains. Within a few years it was found in most drugstores.

With electrification, so too came the potential market for washing machines, refrigerators, vacuum cleaners and a host of other commercial appliances. This was recognised by major manufacturers, like Westinghouse and General Electric, who were already in the business of manufacturing large motors for industrial installations. By 1920, over 500,000 fractional-horsepower motors were powering washers and other appliances in America.

Following World War II, FHP motor manufacturing experienced a new surge as the demand for consumer goods increased. Since that time, demand for these environmentally-friendly motors has continued to grow and the number of applications that they can be used for continues to rise. For example, most automotive systems, power tools, small machines and appliances use FHP motors. Because of the practicality of FHP motors, they continue to be incredibly popular. In 2017, experts estimated that the European FHP market was worth around US$4.5 billion.

After the Second World War, the demand for FHP motors grew, particularly throughout the consumerist boom of the 1950s and 60's. In 2000, the European FHP market was worth an estimated $4.5 billion with some 300-million units in manufacture.

Precision motors
Servo motors and stepper motors are specialist types of fractional-horsepower electric motors usually intended for high-precision or robotics applications. Usually running from a DC supply, when combined with a planetary gearbox can offer accuracies less than 8 arc-minutes (2/15ths of a degree, or approx. 2.3 milliradians). Due to their specialized nature, however, these types of motors tend to be expensive compared with standard, or general-purpose lower-precision units.

Applications
Fractional-horsepower motors are used across a wide range of industries and applications for a variety of motion and compression needs. The largest portion of sales can be attributed to the automotive sector, however, accounting for some 35% of all FHP motor sales, driving auxiliary applications such as electric windows, wind-shield wipers, powered seats, wing mirrors, central locking systems, roof openers, and trunk openers. In Europe, the majority of these applications are fulfilled by the industry's largest players: Brose (formerly Siemens), Bosch, and Nidec (formerly Valeo).

The second-largest area of consumption is the field of white goods, and small domestic appliances (approximately 12% of the European market). For example, FHP motors are being used to drive pumps and compressors in refrigerators, coffee machines, and washing machines, and they provide suction in vacuum cleaners and a variety of other switching and motion tasks across the ever-increasing variety of domestic products. Until the recent divestment of its motors interests, Electrolux was believed to be Europe's largest manufacturer of FHP motors for domestic-appliance applications.

Industrial applications consume a similar number of units to that of domestic products with FHP motors being used across a variety of conveyance and process applications.

Other applications include: pumps & compressors, medical devices, portable tools, office machinery, and HVAC.

References

External links
 CEMEP: Comité Européen de Constructeurs de Machines Electriques et d'Electronique de Puissance
 European Union electrical equipment directives
 NEMA: National Electrical Manufacturers Association (USA)
 IEC: International Electrotechnical Commission
 REMA: Rotating Electrical Machines Association
Whitepaper – Efficiency in Fractional HP Motors & Gearmotors 

Electric motors